The fifth season of Braxton Family Values, an American reality television series, broadcast on WE tv. It premiered on May 19, 2016, and was primarily filmed in Atlanta, Georgia and Los Angeles, California. Its executive producers are Toni Braxton, Tamar Braxton, Vincent Herbert, Dan Cutforth, Jane Lipsitz, Julio Kollerbohm, Michelle Kongkasuwan, Lauren Gellert, Annabelle McDonald and Sitarah Pendelton.

Braxton Family Values focuses on the lives of Toni Braxton and her sisters — Tamar, Traci, Towanda, and Trina — plus their mother, Evelyn.

Production
A teaser trailer revealing the renewal of Braxton Family Values season 5 was released on April 21, 2016, via WE tv's YouTube channel. The season premiered with "Not My Momma!" on May 19, 2016. The season went on a seven-month hiatus in August, 2016. On February 2, 2017, Towanda Braxton released a tea party themed teaser on her Instagram account announcing the series would continue on March 16, 2017, for its sixteenth episode.

Synopsis
Evelyn reveals the news to her daughters about her mini stroke sending the sisters into a panic. Toni and Tamar team up to persuade her to move back to L.A., but the other sisters want her to stay in Atlanta to recuperate. Towanda seeks her sisters help as her daughter Brooke needs to understand the changes a young girl faces leading to uncomfortable questions. Trina announces to her sisters that she has been going to therapy to deal with her issues at hand and confronts them. Trina contacts her ex-husband Gabe leading to visiting a therapist to form a reconciliation in order for her to move on once and for all but Gabe has other plans.   

Traci becomes worried after receiving some unsettling news from her doctor resulting her to undergo surgery. Trina visits a hypnotherapist to deal with her fear of birds, Tamar and Towanda help Trina to confront her fear by leaving Trina so she can face it alone. Toni has been singing about heartache, struggles and fears for years, but this season she conquers one major fear that's been holding her back. Traci goes back into the studio to record tracks for her sophomore album, she invites her sisters Toni, Towanda and Trina to a session later to find out they were tricked asking them to provide background vocals on the song "Broken Things".

U.S. television ratings 
The season's premiere episode "Not My Momma!" attracted over 0.84 thousand viewers during its initial broadcast on May 19, 2016, including 0.38 thousand viewers in the 18–49 demographic via Nielsen ratings. The season's most watched episode "Tabloids, Rumors, & Repercussions", attracted over 1.02 million viewers during its initial broadcast on March 16, 2017, including 0.38 thousand viewers in the 18–49 demographic via Nielsen ratings. Toni did Not Appear In Episode 13.

Episodes

Home media
The first volume of season 5 was released digitally to Amazon and iTunes store in the United States.

References

External links

 
 
 

2016 American television seasons
2017 American television seasons